AACC may refer to:

 Abe Ani Combat Club, a mixed martial arts gym in Japan
 Aboriginal Art and Cultures Centre, scheduled for construction 2021–2024 at Lot Fourteen, Adelaide, Australia
 All Africa Conference of Churches, ecumenical fellowship in Africa
 All Arms Commando Course, course run by the Royal Marines in the UK
 American Association for Clinical Chemistry, a non-profit professional organization involved in the clinical chemistry
 American Association of Cereal Chemists, a non-profit professional organization involved in the science of cereal or grain
 American Association of Community Colleges, a non-profit organization representing the interest of community colleges
 American Automatic Control Council, a professional organization involved in research of control theory
 Anne Arundel Community College, a community college in Maryland, U.S.
 Arab American Chamber of Commerce, corporation based in Washington, D.C.
 Association of Asian Constitutional Courts and Equivalent Institutions, international organization for constitutional justice in Asia
 Australian Army Catering Corps, one of the Australian Army Corps